The 1999–2000 IHL season was the 55th season of the International Hockey League, a North American minor professional league. 13 teams participated in the regular season, and the Chicago Wolves won the Turner Cup.

Offseason
The Indianapolis Ice departed the IHL and joined the CHL for the CHL’s 1999-00 season.

The Las Vegas Thunder we’re forced to fold after the UNLV refused to renew their lease to continue playing at Thomas & Mack Center forcing the Thunder to fold after failing to negotiate with Orleans Arena and MGM Grand Garden Arena

Regular season

Eastern Conference

Western Conference

Turner Cup-Playoffs

Pre-Playoffs

(E4) Cleveland Lumberjacks vs. (E5) Milwaukee Admirals

(W4) Long Beach Ice Dogs vs. (W5) Manitoba Moose

Quarterfinals

(E1) Grand Rapids Griffins vs. (E4) Cleveland Lumberjacks

(E2) Orlando Solar Bears vs. (E3) Cincinnati Cyclones

(W1) Chicago Wolves vs. (W4) Long Beach Ice Dogs

(W2) Utah Grizzlies vs. (W3) Houston Aeros

Semifinals

(E1) Grand Rapids Griffins vs. (E3) Cincinnati Cyclones

(W1) Chicago Wolves vs. (W3) Houston Aeros

Turner Cup Final

(E1) Grand Rapids Griffins vs. (W1) Chicago Wolves

Player statistics

Scoring leaders
Note: GP = Games played; G = Goals; A = Assists; Pts = Points; PIM = Penalty minutes

Leading goaltenders
Note: GP = Games played; Min = Minutes played; GA = Goals against; GAA = Goals against average; W = Wins; L = Losses; T = Ties; SO = Shutouts

Awards

All-Star teams

External links 
 Season 1999/2000 on hockeydb.com

IHL
IHL
IHL
International Hockey League (1945–2001) seasons